Corythucha celtidis, the hackberry lace bug, is a species of lace bug in the family Tingidae. It is found in North America.

Subspecies
These two subspecies belong to the species Corythucha celtidis:
 Corythucha celtidis celtidis Osborn & Drake, 1916
 Corythucha celtidis mississippiensis Drake, 1925

References

Further reading

 
 

Tingidae
Articles created by Qbugbot
Insects described in 1916